The Robert Award for Best Actress in a Leading Role is a Danish Film Academy award presented at the annual Robert Award ceremony to recognize an actress who has delivered an outstanding leading performance in a Danish film.

Honorees

1980s 
 1984: Line Arlien-Søborg – Skønheden og udyret
 1985: Bodil Udsen – 
 1986:  – 
 1987:  – 
 1988: Stéphane Audran – Babettes gæstebud
 1989:  –

1990s 
 1990: Ghita Nørby – Waltzing Regitze
 1991: Dorota Pomykała – 
 1992: Ghita Nørby – Freud's Leaving Home
 1993: Louise Hassing Nielsen – Pain of Love
 1994: Sofie Gråbøl – Sort høst
 1995: Kirsten Rolffes – The Kingdom
 1996: Puk Scharbau – 
 1997: Emily Watson – Breaking the Waves
 1998: Sidse Babett Knudsen – Let's Get Lost
 1999: Bodil Jørgensen – The Idiots

2000s 
 2000: Sidse Babett Knudsen – The One and Only
 2001: Björk for Dancer in the Dark
 Marianne Frost nominated for Break Your Bounds
 Ann Eleonora Jørgensen nominated for Italian for Beginners
 Ghita Nørby nominated for A Place Nearby
 Anette Støvelbæk nominated for Italian for Beginners
 2002: Stine Stengade for Kira's Reason: A Love Story
 Sofie Gråbøl nominated for 
  nominated for One-Hand Clapping
 Sidse Babett Knudsen nominated for Mona's World
 Charlotte Munck nominated for Shake It All About
 2003: Paprika Steen for Okay
  nominated for 
 Maria Bonnevie nominated for I Am Dina
 Trine Dyrholm nominated for 
 Sonja Richter nominated for Open Hearts
 2004: Birthe Neumann for Move Me
 Iben Hjejle nominated for Skagerak
  nominated for Regel nr. 1
 Sidse Babett Knudsen nominated for 
 Stephanie Leòn nominated for 
 2005: Sofie Gråbøl for Aftermath
 Laura Drasbæk nominated for Lost Generation
 Ann Eleonora Jørgensen nominated for In Your Hands
 Lena Endre nominated for Day and Night
 Sonja Richter nominated for Villa Paranoia
 2006: Sofie Gråbøl for Accused
  nominated for 
 Trine Dyrholm nominated for 
 Bryce Dallas Howard nominated for Manderlay
 Birthe Neumann nominated for Solkongen
 2007: Trine Dyrholm for A Soap
  nominated for 
  nominated for Fidibus
 Laura Christensen nominated for Råzone
 Sidse Babett Knudsen nominated for After the Wedding
 2008: Noomi Rapace for Daisy Diamond
  nominated for 
 Bodil Jørgensen nominated for Just like Home
 Julie Kolbech nominated for The Art of Crying
 Paprika Steen nominated for The Substitute
 2009:  for Terribly Happy
 Trine Dyrholm nominated for 
 Rosalinde Mynster nominated for Worlds Apart
 Paprika Steen nominated for Fear Me Not
 Julie Ølgaard nominated for Crying for Love

2010s 
 2010: Paprika Steen for Applause
 Charlotte Gainsbourg nominated for Antichrist
 Birgitte Hjort Sørensen nominated for At World's End
  nominated for 
  nominated for Aching Hearts
 2011: Trine Dyrholm for In a Better World
 Julie Brochorst Andersen nominated for Hold om mig
 Annette Heick nominated for 
 Ellen Hillingsø nominated for The Experiment
  nominated for Smukke mennesker
 2012: Kirsten Dunst for Melancholia
  nominated for A Family
 Frederikke Dahl Hansen nominated for Frit fald
 Barbara Garcia nominated for Rosa Morena
 Tuva Novotny nominated for IDA
 2013: Bodil Jørgensen for Hvidstengruppen and Trine Dyrholm for Love Is All You Need
 2014: Helle Fagralid for Sorg og glæde
 2015: Bodil Jørgensen for All Inclusive
 2016: Tuva Novotny for A War
 Bodil Jørgensen nominated for 
 Ghita Nørby nominated for Key House Mirror
 Marie Tourell Søderberg nominated for Steppeulven
  nominated for 
 2017: Trine Dyrholm for Kollektivet
 2018: Amanda Collin for En frygtelig kvinde
 2019:  for Lykke-Per

2020s 
 2020: Trine Dyrholm for Dronningen
 2021:  for Riders of Justice

See also 

 Bodil Award for Best Actress in a Leading Role

References

External links 
  

1984 establishments in Denmark
Awards established in 1984
Film awards for lead actress
Actress in a Leading Role